Theodore Otis (December 15, 1810 – July 11, 1873) was an American politician, who served as a member of the Massachusetts House of Representatives and the seventh Mayor of Roxbury, Massachusetts from 1859 to 1860.

References

Bibliography
 The Memorial History of Boston: Including Suffolk County, Massachusetts. 1630-1880. Justin Winsor (1881) p. 212.
 Acts and Resolves Passed by the General Court (1865) p. 844.
 A Manual for the Use of the General Court by Stephen Nye Gifford (1864).

 

Members of the Massachusetts House of Representatives
Union College (New York) alumni
Mayors of Roxbury, Massachusetts
Massachusetts Free Soilers
1810 births
1873 deaths